California Proposition 62 may refer to:

 California Proposition 62 (2004)
 California Proposition 62 (2016)